is the 21st major single by the Japanese female idol group Cute, released in Japan on April 3, 2013.

Background 
The title song was first performed live at a series of concerts called Hello! Project Haru no Dai Kansha Hinamatsuri Festival 2013, held on March 2 and 3, 2013.

The single will be released in six versions: Regular Edition and Limited Editions A, B, C, D, and E. The Regular Edition and the limited edition C, D, and E are CD-only. The limited editions A, B, and C include a DVD. All the limited editions are shipped sealed and include a serial-numbered entry card for the lottery to win a ticket to one of the single's launch events.

Track listing

Limited Edition A

Regular Edition, Limited Editions B, C

Limited Edition D

Limited Edition E

Bonus 
Sealed into all the limited editions:
 Event ticket lottery card with a serial number

Charts 

 First week sales according to Oricon: 47,420 copies

References

External links 
 
 

2013 singles
Japanese-language songs
Cute (Japanese idol group) songs
Songs written by Tsunku
Song recordings produced by Tsunku
Zetima Records singles
2013 songs
Japanese synth-pop songs
Dance-pop songs